Meads is a surname. Notable people with the surname include:

 Colin Meads (1936–2017), New Zealand rugby union footballer
 Johnny Meads (born 1961), American football player
 Stanley Meads (born 1938), New Zealand rugby union footballer
 Tommy Meads (1900–1983), English footballer
 Lloyd Meeds (1927–2005), American politician

See also
Mead (surname)
Meade (surname)